Visions is the sixth LP by American country singer-songwriter Don Williams. Released on January 17, 1977 on the ABC-Dot label, the album reached number four on the US Country Albums chart. "Some Broken Hearts Never Mend" was released as a single in 1977, reaching number one on the Billboard country singles chart. Visions was the first of two Don Williams albums released in 1977, along with Country Boy, which was released later the same year.

Background 
Don Williams had achieved his first number one country album the previous year with Harmony. For Visions, Williams was again at the writing and producing helm, and brought on many of the same musicians who'd participated in all of his previous recordings, including Kenny Malone on drums and Danny Flowers on harmonica. Regular writing collaborators Wayland Holyfield, Allen Reynolds and Bob McDill all made contributions to this album.

While Visions was a solid bestseller, it did not have its predecessors chart success. However, along with Harmony and Country Boy, Visions is considered part of the trio of albums that marked the foundation of Williams' commercial and artistic success in the 1970s, both in the US and in the UK. ABC-Dot Records had made a concerted effort to market American country music abroad throughout the mid-1970's, and Williams' Visions was a notable bestseller overseas at the time, with an excess of 200,000 units moved.

Williams' was also becoming well known during this time for his intimate live performances, which featured his regular collaborators, Danny Flowers on Harmonica and Guitars, and David Williamson on Bass.

Track listing 
from the original vinyl

Side A

 "Time On My Hands" (Layng Martine Jr.) – 2:31
 "I'll Never Forget" (Don Williams) – 2:59
 "I'm Getting Good at Missing You" (Wayland Holyfield) – 2:51
 "In The Mornin'" (Williams) – 2:16
 "Missing You, Missing Me" (Allen Reynolds, Williams) – 3:00

Side B

 "Some Broken Hearts Never Mend" (Holyfield) – 2:50
 "Fallin' in Love Again" (David Williamson) – 2:41
 "We Can Sing" (Williams) – 2:30
 "I'll Need Someone to Hold Me (When I Cry)" (Bob McDill, Holyfield) – 3:06
 "Expert At Everything" (Deoin Elijah Lay, Joe Allen) – 2:41
 "Cup O'Tea" (Harlan "HS" White) – 3:06

Personnel
from the original release:

Charles Cochran - accordion, organ, piano, vibraphone, string arrangements 
Jimmy Colvard - acoustic guitar, electric guitar 
Don Williams, Garth Fundis - backing vocals
Joe Allen - bass
Kenny Malone - drums, congas, percussion 
Shane Keister - electric piano, piano 
Buddy Spicher - fiddle
Danny Flowers - harmonica, electric guitar 
Lloyd Green - steel guitar, dobro
Don Williams - lead vocals, acoustic guitar

Production 
from the album liner notes:

 Producer – Don Williams
 Engineer [Recording] – Garth Fundis
 Design [Album] – David Wright
 Art Direction, Photography By – John Donegan

Charts

Weekly charts

Year-end charts

References 

1977 albums
Don Williams albums
ABC Records albums